A Holocaust in Your Head is the debut album for British crust punk/grindcore band Extreme Noise Terror. The album was released in 1989 under High Speed Recordings. After its first release, the album was reissued several times with updated versions of each track.

Track list

References

1989 debut albums
Extreme Noise Terror albums